Free to Be Dirty! Live is a live album by Ol' Dirty Bastard in collaboration with Brooklyn Zu. The release is in CD and DVD format.

Track listing

Ol' Dirty Bastard albums
2005 live albums
2005 video albums
Live video albums